Outer-grazer and inner-grazer are configurations of heliocentric orbit. All six diagrams show the Sun (the orange dot) in the middle and a putative planet's orbital band (in yellow). The latter is a ring whose inner radius is the planet's perihelion and its outer radius the aphelion.

 Middle, top: The minor planet's orbit enters the other planet's orbit from the inside without traversing it; it is an inner-grazer.
 Middle, bottom: The minor planet's orbit enters the planet's from outside without traversing it; it is an outer-grazer.

See also
Earth-grazing fireball, a meteor that grazes Earth's atmosphere rather than the planet's orbit

Space science
Orbits